General Paz Partido is a partido in the northeast of Buenos Aires Province in Argentina.

The partido is named in honour of Brigadier General José María Paz, a veteran of the Argentine War of Independence.

Settlements
Ranchos  (pop. 7,333)
Loma Verde (pop. 596)
Villanueva (pop. 572)
Barrio Río Salado (pop. 60)
Alegre
Rural area (pop. 1,758)

See also
Río Salado (Buenos Aires)

References

External links

 Provincial Website
 Sociedad Rural de General Paz

1864 establishments in Argentina
Partidos of Buenos Aires Province